Darko Jevtić (born 8 February 1993) is a Swiss professional footballer who plays as an attacking midfielder for Russian side Rubin Kazan. He is of Serbian origin.

Club career

Basel
Jevtić started his youth football with Basel. In 2015 he moved across town played for nearly a year in the Concordia Basel youth team but returned to Basel in August 2006. He played in their U-16 team and was part of the team that won the Swiss Championship in 2008 and 2009. Later he played in the U-18 team, the U-19 team in the 2011–12 NextGen series and the U-21 team before he signed his first professional contract and joined their first team in January 2012.

He joined Basel's first team during the winter break of their 2011–12 season under head coach Heiko Vogel. After having appeared in four test games, Jevtić played his domestic league debut for the club, being substituted in, during the away game in the Letzigrund on 28 July 2012 as Basel played a 2–2 draw with Grasshopper Club He had a starting eleven appearances in the Swiss Cup match on 15 September 2012 away against amateur club FC Amriswil and in the last league match of the season at home game in the St. Jakob-Park he played the full 90 minutes as Basel won 1–0 against St. Gallen.

At the end of the Swiss Super League season 2012–13 he won the Championship title with the team. In the 2012–13 Swiss Cup Basel reached the final, but were runners up behind Grasshopper Club, being defeated 4–3 on penalties, following a 1–1 draw after extra time. In the 2012–13 UEFA Europa League Basel advanced as far as the semi-finals, there being matched against the reigning UEFA Champions League holders Chelsea, but they were knocked out, losing both home and away ties, beaten 2–5 on aggregate.

In the next season, after appearing in six test games, Jevtić was in the starting formation in the cup game on 17 August 2013 as Basel won 1–0 against local amateur club BSC Old Boys.

Wacker Innsbruck (loan)
On 2 September 2013, Basel announced that Jevtić had joined the Austrian club Wacker Innsbruck on a one-year loan.

Lech Poznań (loan)
On 11 June 2014, Jevtić was loaned to Polish Ekstraklasa club, Lech Poznań. The contract contained the option of a definite purchase and on 25 January 2015, Lech Pozan pulled the option and Jevtić signed a three-and-a-half-year contract.

During his short period with Basel's first team, Jevtić played a total of 15 games for them scoring a total of three goals. two of these games were in the Swiss Super League, two in the Swiss Cup and 11 were friendly games. He scored all three of his goals during the test games.

Lech Poznań
The Swiss midfielder soon became a key player for the team and stayed with them for six years.

Interesting at this point is, that Jevtić's new club was drawn against his youth club in the 2015–16 UEFA Champions League qualifying phase in the third qualifying round. The first leg was held on 29 July 2015 in the INEA Stadion, in Poznań, but Jevtić did not play in this game. With 3–1 Basel won this game. The second leg was played in the St. Jakob-Park on 5 August, Jevtić was in the starting eleven, but Basel won this game 1–0. Lech Pozan continued in the Europa League play-off round and with a 4–0 aggregate win against Videoton they qualified themselves for the 2015–16 UEFA Europa League group stage. Basel continued in the Champions League play-off round. But, with two draws, 2–2 at home and 1–1 away, and a 3–3 aggregate, Basel were defeated on the away goals rule by Maccabi Tel Aviv. Basel too were to continue in the Europa League group stage. Ironically, the two teams were drawn together again, in the same group. The first direct match, on 1 October, was a home match for Basel. Jevtić played in the starting eleven, but the game ended 2–0 for Basel. The return match was in Pozan on 10 December and Jevtić again played in the starting team, but Basel won 1–0. Ending the group in first position Basel qualified themselves for the knockout phase. Ending the group in third position Lech Pozan were eliminated from the competition.

Jevtić gathered excellent figures in his Polish career (scoring 33 goals and giving 32 assists in 155 matches).

Rubin Kazan
On 22 January 2020, he signed a 4.5-year contract with Russian club Rubin Kazan. With Rubin Kazan he also obtained good playing time (41 matches, 4 goals, 4 assists).

AEK Athens (loan)
On 31 August 2021, he signed a one-year contract with Greek club AEK Athens on loan from Russian club Rubin Kazan.

Following his good time with Lech Poznań and then with FC Rubin Kazan there's a worrying period about his career path with AEK Athens, as he is at the shadow of captain Petros Mantalos. When it was acquired on loan last summer, everyone believed that this addition would be a serious reason for intense competition with the team captain. Something that happened in two games during the days of Vladan Milojević on the bench of the club, while Argirios Giannikis trusted him even less. But during January 2022, probably the decrease of Μantalos' performance open the door of the starting XI since he was acquired.

International career
On 6 June 2013, Jevtić made his debut for the Swiss U-21 team as left winger in the 2–3 away defeat against Sweden. During his third appearance for the team on 5 September 2013, in the Group 5 qualification game to the 2015 UEFA European Under-21 Football Championships, he scored his first goal for them in the 2–0 away win against Latvia U-21 team in Slokas Stadium, Jūrmala.

Career statistics

Club

1 Including Polish SuperCup.

Honours
Basel U16
 Swiss Champion: 2007–08, 2008–09

Basel
 Swiss Super League: 2012–13
 Swiss Cup runner-up: 2012–13

Lech Poznań
 Ekstraklasa: 2014–15
 Polish SuperCup: 2015, 2016

References

Sources
 Die ersten 125 Jahre. Publisher: Josef Zindel im Friedrich Reinhardt Verlag, Basel. 
 Verein "Basler Fussballarchiv" Homepage

External links

 Profile at FC Basel 
 
 
 

1993 births
Living people
Association football midfielders
Swiss men's footballers
Switzerland under-21 international footballers
Switzerland youth international footballers
FC Basel players
FC Wacker Innsbruck (2002) players
Lech Poznań players
FC Rubin Kazan players
AEK Athens F.C. players
Swiss Super League players
Austrian Football Bundesliga players
Ekstraklasa players
Russian Premier League players
Swiss expatriate footballers
Expatriate footballers in Austria
Swiss expatriate sportspeople in Austria
Expatriate footballers in Poland
Swiss expatriate sportspeople in Poland
Expatriate footballers in Russia
Swiss expatriate sportspeople in Russia
Expatriate footballers in Greece
Swiss expatriate sportspeople in Greece
Swiss people of Serbian descent
Footballers from Basel